Giles Cooper Entertainment (GCE Live) is a concert promoting company, producing tours and hundreds of shows for music, comedy and theatre throughout the UK. GCE Live also presents and produces outdoor concerts in the grounds of English Heritage and other stately homes such as Kenwood House on London’s Hampstead Heath and Audley End House and Gardens in Saffron Walden, Essex

Founders
Giles Cooper Entertainment (GCE Live) was founded by Giles Cooper in 2016. The company's CEO, Giles Cooper, is Chairman of the Royal Variety Charity and an Executive Producer of the Royal Variety Performance. The company's founder, Giles Cooper was elected Chairman of the Royal Variety Charity by entertainment industry professionals in 2010  of which Her Majesty The Queen is sole Patron. 
He was re-elected by unanimous vote in 2016 

Giles Cooper was also awarded :
 Fellow of the Royal Society of Arts, 2006.
 Freedom of the City of London, 2014.

Artists performing at GCE events
GCE Live has promoted tours and  produced shows for artists, including bands such as Placebo and the Happy Mondays and theatre and spoken-word tours for BBC TV presenters such as Simon Reeve and Dan Snow.

They have produced shows for artists such as Kris Kristofferson, Alfie Boe, Hacienda Classical, Orbital and Leftfield, José Carreras, the Human League and, ABC and the Jacksons

These include the well-known artists listed below:
 Jess Glynne
 Rudimental
 Madness
 The Jacksons
 The Hives
 José Carreras
 Kris Kristofferson
 Alfie Boe
 Placebo
 Happy Mondays
 The Human League
 Simon Reeve

References

External links

Entertainment companies established in 2016
Companies based in London
Music promoters